Audentity is the fifteenth album by Klaus Schulze. It was originally released in 1983, and in 2005 was the eleventh Schulze album reissued by Revisited Records. The reissue of Audentity is one of two examples of a Klaus Schulze reissue that changes the original order of the tracks (the other being Das Wagner Desaster Live).

Overview
As with Schulze's previous recording, Trancefer, Audentity is also heavily reliant on sequencers, but is less harsh in style. This is particularly evident in the tracks "Cellistica" and "Spielglocken". However, the heavy reliance on sequenced sound is not the case for all the tracks, and indeed "Sebastian im Traum" hints towards the operatic style of some of Schulze's much later works (like Totentag). "Sebastian im Traum", named after a poetry book of Georg Trakl, also contains a brief musical sequence that can be heard in the Michael Mann 1986 film Manhunter.

Track listing
All tracks composed by Klaus Schulze.

Disc 1

Disc 2

Personnel
Klaus Schulze – Computer and keys, program
Rainer Bloss – Sounds, Glockenspiel
Michael Shrieve – EEH Computer, Simmons percussion
Wolfgang Tiepold – Cello

References

External links
 Audentity at the official site of Klaus Schulze
 

Klaus Schulze albums
1983 albums